The Glorious Fool is a 1922 American silent romantic comedy drama film directed by E. Mason Hopper and starring Helene Chadwick, Richard Dix and Vera Lewis. It was based on the short stories In the Pavillion and Twenty-Two by Mary Roberts Rinehart.

Cast
 Helene Chadwick as Jane Brown
 Richard Dix as Billy Grant
 Vera Lewis as Miss Hart
 Kate Lester as Head Nurse
 Otto Hoffman as Dummy
 John Lince as Jenks
 Theodore von Eltz as Senior Surgical Interne
 Frederick Vroom as Mr. Lindley Grant
 Lillian Langdon as Mrs. Lindley Grant
 George Cooper as Al

References

Bibliography
 Connelly, Robert B. The Silents: Silent Feature Films, 1910-36, Volume 40, Issue 2. December Press, 1998.
 Munden, Kenneth White. The American Film Institute Catalog of Motion Pictures Produced in the United States, Part 1. University of California Press, 1997.

External links
 

1922 films
1922 drama films
American silent feature films
Films directed by E. Mason Hopper
American black-and-white films
Goldwyn Pictures films
1920s English-language films
1920s American films
Silent American drama films